Aldo Martínez Hechavaria (born August 27, 1968) is retired male wrestler from Cuba. He represented his native country at the 1992 Summer Olympics in Barcelona, Spain, and twice won a gold medal at the Pan American Games during his career.

References
 

1968 births
Living people
Wrestlers at the 1992 Summer Olympics
Cuban male sport wrestlers
Olympic wrestlers of Cuba
World Wrestling Championships medalists
Pan American Games gold medalists for Cuba
Pan American Games medalists in wrestling
Wrestlers at the 1987 Pan American Games
Wrestlers at the 1991 Pan American Games
Medalists at the 1987 Pan American Games
Medalists at the 1991 Pan American Games
20th-century Cuban people
21st-century Cuban people